The 29th annual Venice International Film Festival was held from 25 August to 7 September 1968. The May 1968 events in France had serious repercussions on this festival. Five days before the festival was to be held, directors of the Italian filmmakers association ANAC, for both political and cultural reasons, withdrew their films from the competition. The Communist Party and the Socialist Party of Proletarian Unity were in favor of the boycott. Some directors, however, defected from this decision and Roberto Rossellini, Liliana Cavani, Bernardo Bertolucci and Nelo Risi decided to project their films. Pier Paolo Pasolini initially refused to participate at the festival, but finally his film entered in Competition.

During the inauguration day, the police had occupied the Palazzo del Cinema del Lido. The inauguration ceremony was skipped and a decision was taken to go ahead with the festival in a self-managed way, with the director of the festival, Chiarini, as chairman. The next day the police intervened and the meetings were canceled. Finally the competition started on the evening of 27 August, while demonstrations against "the fascist and bourgeois exhibition" were taking place outside the Palazzo.

Jury
 Guido Piovene (Italy) (head of jury)
 Jacques Doniol-Valcroze (France)  
 Akira Iwasaki (Japan)    
 Roger Manvell (UK)
 István Nemeskürty (Hungary) 
 Vicente Antonio Pineda (Spain)
 Edgar Reitz (West Germany)

Films in competition

Awards
Golden Lion:
Artists Under the Big Top: Perplexed (Alexander Kluge)
Special Jury Prize:
Our Lady of the Turks (Carmelo Bene)
Le Socrate (Robert Lapoujade)
Mandabi (Ousmane Sembène)
Volpi Cup:
 Best Actor - John Marley - (Faces)
 Best Actress - Laura Betti  - (Teorema)
Honorable Mention - Kierion (Dimos Theos)
Pasinetti Award
Best Film - Faces (John Cassavetes)

References

External links
 
 Venice Film Festival 1968 Awards on IMDb

Venice International Film Festival
Venice International Film Festival
Venice Film Festival
Film
Venice International Film Festival
Venice International Film Festival